Thomas Alan may refer to:

 Thomas Alan Goldsborough (1877–1951), U.S. jurist and politician
 Thomas Alan Stephenson (1898–1961), British marine biologist
 Thomas Alan Abercrombie, writer and professor of anthropology
 Thomas Alan Waits, singer-songwriter

See also

 Alan G. Thomas (1911–1992), British bibliophile and Lawrence Durrell scholar
 Allen Thomas (1830–1907), Confederate States Army brigadier general
 Thomas Allan (1777–1833), Scottish mineralogist
 Thomas Allen (disambiguation)
 Tom Alan Robbins, American actor
 Tom Allen (born 1945), former member of the United States House of Representatives